Ghoradia (Sauria) is a village in Puri district in the state of Odisha, India. 
Ghoradia is a village in Delanga Tehsil in Puri District of Odisha State, India. It is located 37 km towards North from District headquarters Puri. 5 km from Delanga. 30 km from State capital Bhubaneswar

Ghoradia Pin code is 752015 and postal head office is Delang .

Muninda ( 4 km ), Kalyanpur ( 5 km ), Trilochanapur ( 5 km ), Sujanpur ( 6 km ), Beraboi ( 7 km ) are the nearby Villages to Sauria. Sauria is surrounded by Jatni Tehsil towards North, Kanas Tehsil towards South, Khordha Tehsil towards west, Pipili Tehsil towards East .

Jatani, Khordha, Bhubaneswar, Puri are the nearby Cities to Ghoradia.

This Place is in the border of the Puri District and Khordha District. Khordha District Jatni is North towards this place .

References 

Villages in Puri district